Mamoudou-Elimane Hanne (born 6 March 1988 in Ségou, Mali) is a French, former Malian,  sprint athlete.

International competitions

References

1988 births
Living people
People from Ségou
French male sprinters
Malian male sprinters
World Athletics Championships athletes for France
Malian emigrants to France
Athletes (track and field) at the 2018 Mediterranean Games
Mediterranean Games bronze medalists for France
Mediterranean Games medalists in athletics